Pancar Motor was founded in 1956 and manufactured Turkey's first diesel engines. Due to its reliable motopumps, Pancar Motor became synonymous with diesel motopumps. The company is still producing diesel engines and motopumps today.

References

External links
 Pancar Motor website

Diesel engine manufacturers
Engine manufacturers of Turkey
Vehicle manufacturing companies established in 1956
Turkish companies established in 1956
Industrial buildings in Turkey